Tesho Akindele (born March 31, 1992) is a Canadian former professional soccer player.

Club career

Early career
Tesho Akindele was born in Canada to a Nigerian father and a Canadian mother and moved with his family to the US at the age of eight. He grew up in Thornton, Colorado, and was a standout for Northglenn High School, turning down an offer to join the Colorado Rapids academy at the age of 17 to focus on academics.

Akindele played four years of college soccer at the Colorado School of Mines, where he became the school's all-time goals leader with 76 goals scored and was a four-time All-American. He ranked second in the nation in goals scored in 2012 with 22 and was named a First Team NSCAA All-American and the 2012 RMAC Offensive Player of the Year for his efforts. Also an NSCAA First Team All-American and the RMAC Freshman of the Year in 2010, Akindele was the first player in the history of his school's conference to score three consecutive hat tricks.

Akindele also made a single appearance for USL PDL club Real Colorado Foxes in 2013.

FC Dallas
On January 16, 2014, Akindele was drafted in the first round (sixth overall) of the 2014 MLS SuperDraft by FC Dallas, becoming the highest-highest-drafted NCAA Division II player in MLS history. Akindele made his professional debut in a 2–3 loss against Seattle Sounders FC on April 12, 2014. After scoring seven goals in 26 appearances, Akindele was named MLS Rookie of the Year.

Orlando City 
On December 9, 2018, Dallas traded Akindele to Orlando City in exchange for $100,000 of Targeted Allocation Money in 2019 and $50,000 of General Allocation Money in 2020. He scored on his debut, a 2–2 draw in Orlando's season opener against New York City FC. Akindele had his option for the 2020 season exercised by Orlando, keeping him with the club for 2020. On May 1, 2021, Akindele broke the record for the fastest goal scored in Orlando City history when he intercepted a backpass from Nick Hagglund to score the opener of a 3–0 win over FC Cincinnati in 31 seconds, breaking the previous record of 63 seconds set by Chris Mueller in 2018. Upon completion of the 2021 season, Akindele's option for the 2022 season was picked up by Orlando. The club declined Akindele's contract option as part of the end of season roster moves on November 14, 2022. At the time of his departure he ranked second all-time in appearances for the club in all competitions with 121 behind only Chris Mueller and sixth for goals with 21.

In December 2022, Akindele announced his retirement from professional soccer.

International career
Akindele attended a youth training camp of the Canadian youth national team in 2009 and played for Canada's U-17 national team in a friendly against Costa Rica on April 2, 2009. On November 5, 2014, it was reported that Akindele had turned down a call-up from Canada with a view to represent the United States instead, and on January 9, 2015, he was called up to the United States senior team camp ahead of friendly matches versus Chile and Panama. He did not play in either friendly due to not having an American passport at the time of the friendlies.

However, on April 14, 2015, Canada coach Benito Floro told media that Akindele was "99.9 percent" going to represent Canada instead of the United States, and on June 2, Akindele accepted a call-up to the Canadian national team for two 2018 FIFA World Cup qualifying matches against Dominica. He made his debut for Canada against Dominica on June 11. He scored his first goal for Canada on June 16 in the return leg against Dominica at BMO Field in a 4–0 victory. Akindele scored his second Canada goal in a 1–1 friendly draw in June 2016 with Azerbaijan.

Having been left out of the original 23-man squad for the 2021 CONCACAF Gold Cup, Akindele was called-up by Canada at the quarter-final stage on July 23 as an injury replacement for Ayo Akinola. He appeared as a 70th-minute substitute against Costa Rica as Canada progressed to the semi-finals with a 2–0 win.

Career statistics

Club

International

International goals
As of match played January 7, 2020. Canada score listed first, score column indicates score after each Akindele goal.

Honours

Club 
FC Dallas
Supporters' Shield: 2016
U.S. Open Cup: 2016

Orlando City
U.S. Open Cup: 2022

Individual 
MLS Rookie of the Year: 2014

References

External links 
 

1992 births
Living people
Canadian soccer players
Canadian expatriate soccer players
Colorado Mines Orediggers men's soccer players
Real Colorado Foxes players
FC Dallas players
Orlando City SC players
Orlando City B players
Association football forwards
Expatriate soccer players in the United States
FC Dallas draft picks
USL League Two players
Major League Soccer players
MLS Next Pro players
Canada men's youth international soccer players
Canada men's international soccer players
Canadian sportspeople of Nigerian descent
Soccer players from Calgary
2015 CONCACAF Gold Cup players
People from Thornton, Colorado